Jack Lambert (29 December 1899 – 13 March 1976) was a British film and television actor.

Selected filmography

 A Honeymoon Adventure (1931) - Chauffeur
 Sorrell and Son (1933) - (uncredited)
 Red Ensign (1934) - Police Inspector (uncredited)
 The Ghost Goes West (1935) - Son of MacLaggen (uncredited)
 House Broken (1936) - Jock Macgregor
 The Last Adventurers (1937) - (uncredited)
 Premiere (1938) - Stage Manager
 Thistledown (1938) - (uncredited)
 The Terror (1938) - Warder Joyce (uncredited)
 Marigold (1938) - Minor Role (uncredited)
 The Outsider (1939) - (uncredited)
 The Spy in Black (1939) - Passport Official (uncredited)
 The Four Feathers (1939) - (uncredited)
 Goodbye, Mr. Chips (1939) - Padre (uncredited)
 The Spider (1940) - Smith
 Nine Men (1943) - Sergeant Watson 
 The Captive Heart (1946) - Padre
 Meet Me at Dawn (1947) - Minor Role (uncredited)
 Dear Murderer (1947) - (uncredited)
 The Brothers (1947) - (uncredited)
 Eureka Stockade (1949) - Commissioner Rede
 Floodtide (1949) - Anstruther
 Hunted (1952) - (uncredited)
 The Lost Hours (1952) - John Parker
 The Great Game (1953) - Ralph Blake
 Twice Upon a Time (1953) - Ernest (uncredited)
 The Master of Ballantrae (1953) - (uncredited)
 Front Page Story (1954) - (uncredited)
 The Sea Shall Not Have Them (1954) - Squadron Leader Craig
 Companions in Crime (1954)
 Three Cases of Murder (1955) - Inspector Acheson ("You Killed Elizabeth" segment)
 Out of the Clouds (1955) - Chief Engineer
 The Dark Avenger (1955) - Dubois
 Track the Man Down (1955) - Dr. Jameson (uncredited)
 Cross Channel (1955) - Detective Sergeant Burroughs
 Storm Over the Nile (1955) - Colonel
 Lost (1956) - Police Station Sergeant (uncredited)
 Jumping for Joy (1956) - Clinton (uncredited)
 Reach for the Sky (1956) - Adrian Stoop (uncredited)
 The Last Man to Hang? (1956) - Maj. Forth
 X the Unknown (1956) - Police Sergeant (uncredited)
 Mr. Adams and Eve (1957) - Cyril (Episode "The Torn-Shirt School of Acting")
 The Little Hut (1957) - Capt. MacWalt
 The Son of Robin Hood (1958) - Will Scarlett
 The Bridal Path (1959) - Hector
 The Devil's Disciple (1959) - (uncredited)
 The Shakedown (1960) - Sgt. Kershaw
 Francis of Assisi (1961) - Scefi
 Greyfriars Bobby (1961) - Doctor
 On the Fiddle (1961) - Police Constable
 Bomb in the High Street (1963) - Sergeant
 A Shot in the Dark (1964) - Man (uncredited)
 Dracula: Prince of Darkness (1966) - Brother Peter
 Modesty Blaise (1966) - (uncredited)
 They Came From Beyond Space (1967) - Doctor - Office
 Cuckoo Patrol (1967) - Police Inspector
 Kidnapped (1971) - Aged Highlander
 Special Branch (1974) - John Miller

Selected stage credits
 A Song of Sixpence by Ian Hay and Guy Bolton (1930)
 Leave It to Psmith by Ian Hay and P.G. Wodehouse (1930)
 The Innocent Party by H.M. Harwood (1938)
 Ace of Clubs by Noël Coward (1950)

References

External links
 

1899 births
1976 deaths
British male film actors
British male stage actors
20th-century British male actors